Jan Tore Magnus "Turbo" Svensson (born 10 March 1969) is a Swedish former professional footballer who played as a midfielder. He won 32 caps for the Sweden national team, and represented his country at UEFA Euro 2000 and the 2002 FIFA World Cup.

Club career
Svensson was born in Vinberg, Sweden. His career started in Vinbergs IF, but he soon joined Halmstads BK in the Swedish Allsvenskan championship. From 1998 to 2002 he moved abroad to play for Viking F.K. in Norway, where he was a big fan favourite. He became the most expensive player in the Danish Superliga when he was bought by Danish club Brøndby IF for NOK 12,5 million in spring 2000. He rejoined Halmstad in 2002.

2006 was Svensson's final year in Halmstad, and he moved back to Vinberg in 2007.

International career 
Svensson made his debut for the Sweden national team in a friendly game against Japan on 22 February 1996. He scored his first international goal for Sweden on 12 February 2001 in a friendly game against China after coming on as a substitute for Mattias Jonson in the second half of a 2-2 draw.

He made his competitive debut for Sweden in a UEFA Euro 2000 qualifier against England when he replaced Henrik Larsson in the 70th minute in a 0-0 draw. He appeared in a total of three UEFA Euro 2000 qualifying games as Sweden qualified for UEFA Euro 2000. The following summer he was selected for Sweden's UEFA Euro 2000 squad and played in the group stage games against Turkey and Italy as Sweden failed to reach the quarter-finals.

Svensson appeared in two 2002 FIFA World Cup qualifying games as Sweden qualified for their first FIFA World Cup since 1994. He played in all four games for Sweden at the final tournament as Sweden reached the second round before being eliminated by Senegal on golden goal.

He played in two UEFA Euro 2004 qualifying games but did not make the final tournament squad. His last international appearance came on 11 June 2003 in a UEFA Euro 2004 qualifying game against Poland. Being a full international for Sweden between 1996 and 2003, Svensson won a total of 32 caps and scored 2 goals.

Career statistics

International 

 Scores and results list Sweden's goal tally first, score column indicates score after each Svensson goal.

Honours
Halmstads BK
 Allsvenskan: 1997

 Svenska Cupen: 1994–95

Brøndby IF
 Danish Superliga: 2001–02
Individual

 Stor Grabb: 2001

References

External links
 Official site
 Halmstads BK profile
 Brøndby IF profile
 Career stats at Voetbal International

1969 births
Living people
Association football midfielders
Association football defenders
Swedish footballers
Sweden international footballers
Danish Superliga players
Allsvenskan players
Eliteserien players
Vinbergs IF players
Halmstads BK players
Viking FK players
Brøndby IF players
Kniksen Award winners
UEFA Euro 2000 players
2002 FIFA World Cup players
Swedish expatriate footballers
Expatriate footballers in Norway
Swedish expatriate sportspeople in Norway
Expatriate men's footballers in Denmark
Swedish expatriate sportspeople in Denmark